National Voices for Equality, Education and Enlightenment (NVEEE) is an American nonprofit organization that works to prevent bullying, violence, and suicide among youth, families and communities. 

NVEE programs include direct service, mentoring and prevention education.

Established in October 2009,  NVEEE is headquartered in Miami, Florida.

Description 
NVEE has created partnerships with: 
 University of Miami School of Education
Florida International University College of Law
 Barry University School of Nursing
 Kids in Distress
the YES Institute  
NVEEE works prevent bullying and victimization, whether it is by peer-on-peer ignorance, bystanderism, or institutional intolerance.

The signature ‘Not on My Watch’ Pledge is a part of NVEEE's Anti-Bullying Campaign. Communities, students, teachers, community leaders and politicians nationwide are asked to end school violence by refusing to be  bystanders.

External links
 Home page

References

Non-profit organizations based in Florida